Dienes, Dénes, Gyenis, or Gyenes is a Hungarian surname. The name can be found within Hungary, its neighboring regions, and across the wider Hungarian diaspora. It is the Hungarian variant of Dennis, which derives its meaning from Dionysus, the Thracian god of wine. Notable people with the surname include:

 András Dienes, Hungarian footballer
 Dávid Gyenes, Hungarian footballer
 Emanuel Gyenes, Romanian rally driver
 Katherine Dienes, New Zealand-born organist, conductor and composer working in England
 Paul Dienes, Hungarian mathematician
 Zoltán Pál Dienes, Hungarian mathematician

References

Hungarian-language surnames